Somewhere Down the Road may refer to:

Somewhere Down the Road (album), album by Amy Grant
Somewhere Down the Road (Amy Grant song)
Somewhere Down the Road (Barry Manilow song)